Sibi (Balochi: سِبّی or سݔبی ) is a city situated in the Balochistan province of Pakistan. The city is the headquarters of the district and tehsil of the same name.

Etymology
The origin of the town's name is attributed to Rani Sewi, a Hindu lady of the Sewa Dynasty who ruled Balochistan before the 7th century.

History
The history of the Sibi region dates back to the 7th century at the earliest, when it was ruled by the Sewa dynasty. In the early 13th century, Sibi was a dependency of Multan under Nasiruddin Qabacha of the Ghurid Empire. The area was then variously subject to Multan or Sindh throughout much of its history. The Arghun dynasty of Kandahar invaded in the late 15th century and seized Sibi from the Samma dynasty of Sindh, but it was returned to Sindh during the Mughal period. Sibi was governed by the Kalhora dynasty during the early 18th century, which in turn paid tribute to the Afsharids after Nader Shah's invasion in 1737. In 1747, the Durrani Empire assumed control of Sibi and appointed local administrators from the Barozai clan.

Sibi came under the control of the British Crown in 1880, and was an important junction on the Harnai and Quetta loop railway lines. It later achieved independence as part of the new nation of Pakistan in 1947.

Besides the town of Sibi, the district once included the hill station of Ziarat, the summer residence of the government, and the Victoria Memorial Hall, now known as Jirga Hall, which was built in 1903.

Demography
Balochi, Sindhi and Siraiki make majority of the population with Pashto, Brahui and others are also spoken by smaller communities. Urdu serves as lingua franca being the national language.

Festivals

Sibi Mela is celebrated every February and has been observed since the 18th century.

Climate
Sibi has globally recorded high temperatures, especially in the month of June with an average of 52 °C in the afternoon. Precipitation is light and mainly falls in two distinct periods: early spring in March and April, and during monsoon season in July and August.

See also
 Barozai
Sibi District
 Mehergarh
 Mizri
 Bibi Nani
 Khajjak
 Dehpal
 Marghazani
 Kurak

Notes

Sibi City

Populated places in Sibi District
Sibi District